Aegle nubila is a moth of the family Noctuidae. It is found in Turkey.

Hadeninae
Endemic fauna of Turkey
Moths described in 1891
Moths of Asia